Józef Klukowski (2 January 1894 – 29 April 1945) was a Polish sculptor. In 1932 he won a gold medal in the art competitions of the Olympic Games for his "Wieńczenie zawodnika" ("Sport Sculpture"). Four years later he won a silver medal in the art competitions of the Olympic Games for his "Piłkarze" ("Football").

He took part in the Warsaw Uprising in 1944 and was killed on a transport from the Sachsenhausen concentration camp while being moved to Bergen-Belsen.

References

External links
 

1894 births
1945 deaths
Polish sculptors
Polish male sculptors
Olympic gold medalists in art competitions
Olympic silver medalists in art competitions
20th-century sculptors
Resistance members who died in Nazi concentration camps
Olympic competitors in art competitions
Medalists at the 1936 Summer Olympics
Medalists at the 1932 Summer Olympics
Polish people who died in Bergen-Belsen concentration camp
Warsaw Uprising insurgents
Sachsenhausen concentration camp prisoners